Mark Patrick Heaslip (born December 26, 1951) is an American former professional ice hockey forward who played 117 games in the National Hockey League (NHL) for the New York Rangers and Los Angeles Kings.

External links

1951 births
Living people
American men's ice hockey forwards
Ice hockey people from Duluth, Minnesota
Los Angeles Kings players
New York Rangers players
Undrafted National Hockey League players